Adrian James Simpson, (born 24 April 1971) is an English television presenter, currently presenting on Sky News on the overnight programme.

Simpson was born Carshalton, Surrey, he started his television career as a presenter on the BBC's Top Gear. He left as part of the programme's revamp to Channel 5's Fifth Gear, joining colleagues Vicki Butler Henderson, Tiff Needell and Quentin Willson. Between 2007 and 2009, he also presented the summary and video episodes of Police Camera Action! with the ITV newsreader Alastair Stewart.

In June 2010, Simpson became a news presenter on Sky News overnight programme.

In July 2011, Simpson became a director at Chillisauce Ltd. At Chillisauce, Simpson was in charge of a marketing campaign for 'Wear it Pink' in aid of breast cancer awareness, which involved building the worlds largest bra, and erecting it on ITV tower. The Worlds Largest Bra was unveiled live on 'This Morning' TV programme on October 22nd 2011. 

In August 2013, Simpson became a presenter of the BBC One programme Fight Back Britain alongside Julia Bradbury and in January 2014 joined the presenting team on Channel 4's A Place in the Sun.

In 2016, Simpson changed career and founded a company called 'All Speeches Great and Small' offering professional speech writing services, which he continues to run as of 2023.

References

External links

All Speeches Great and Small

1971 births
Living people
Television personalities from London
British television presenters
People from Carshalton
Sky News newsreaders and journalists
Top Gear people